Peki is a town in the South Dayi District in the Volta Region of Ghana. It comprises eight subtowns, each with a subchief - Tsame, Avetile, Afeviwofe, Blengo, Dzake, Wudome, Dzobati and Adzokoe. All of these subchiefs swear allegiance to a paramount chief known as Deiga. The current paramount chief is Deiga Kwadzo Dei XII. The town is known for the Peki Secondary School, the E.P Seminary and the government training college GOVCO.  The school is a second cycle institution.

History
Kwadzo Dei Tutu Yao II invited Reverend Lorenz Wulf of the North German Missionary Society to Peki. Wulf arrived on November 14, 1847, a date which is celebrated for the foundation of the Evangelical Presbyterian Church in Ghana. In 1848 he founded a school. Wulf provided a description of Peki:

Institutions 

 Peki Government Hospital
 Peki College of Education
 Peki Senior High School

References

Populated places in the Volta Region